Leeanne Margaret Enoch is an Australian politician currently serving as the Minister for Communities and Housing and Minister for the Arts and Digital Economy of Queensland. She has also served as the Labor Party member for Algester in the Queensland Legislative Assembly since 2015.

Early life and education
Enoch was born the oldest of four, and became the first member of her family to graduate from university. She is the sister of playwright Wesley Enoch, who is the eldest of three brothers.

Career 
Enoch worked as a high school English and drama teacher in schools across South-East Queensland and East London, later becoming a manager of Aboriginal and Torres Strait Islander policy in the State Education Department.

Upon her election to the Queensland Parliament in 2015, Enoch became a first-term cabinet minister, becoming Minister for Housing and Public Works and Minister for Science and Innovation. Her department launched the Advance Queensland initiative in June 2015, in a drive to create jobs in new and emerging industries. The Advance Queensland Expert Panel is an independent panel created to provide advice to government.

She served as Minister for Environment and the Great Barrier Reef, Minister for Science, and Minister for Housing and Public Works ( 2017). 

Enoch is an Aboriginal Australian of the Quandamooka people of North Stradbroke Island, and is the first Indigenous Australian woman elected to the Queensland Parliament. (She was followed in 2017 by Cynthia Lui, the first Torres Strait Islander to be elected to any parliament.)

As of September 2021, Enoch serves as the Minister for Communities and Housing, Minister for Digital Economy and Minister for the Arts.

Other activities

Enoch was a witness in Eatock v Bolt, a 2011 decision of the Federal Court of Australia which held that two articles written by columnist and commentator Andrew Bolt and published in The Herald Sun newspaper had contravened section 18C, of the Racial Discrimination Act 1975. Bolt had accused Enoch and other Aboriginal people of "choosing" their identity for personal benefit.

See also 
List of Indigenous Australian politicians
Women in the Queensland Legislative Assembly
First Palaszczuk Ministry
Second Palaszczuk Ministry
Third Palaszczuk Ministry

References

External links 

Year of birth missing (living people)
Living people
Members of the Queensland Legislative Assembly
Indigenous Australian politicians
Australian schoolteachers
Griffith University alumni
Alumni of the University of East London
Australian Labor Party members of the Parliament of Queensland
Labor Left politicians
21st-century Australian politicians
Women members of the Queensland Legislative Assembly
21st-century Australian women politicians
20th-century Australian women